The Commander of the Pontifical Swiss Guard is the head of the Pontifical Swiss Guard. In total, there have been 35 commanders of the Swiss Guard serving 51 popes,  with interruptions during 1527–1548 following the Sack of Rome, in 1564/5, in 1704–1712 and in 1798/9 following the French invasion. 
24 out of 35 commanders were citizens of the city of Lucerne (not counting the incumbent, Christoph Graf, who is from Pfaffnau in the canton of Lucerne). During 1652–1847 the office became quasi-heritable, with ten commanders members of the Pfyffer von Altishofen family of Lucerne.
Two commanders were from Zürich, serving during the years of the Swiss Reformation; in modern times, three commanders were from St. Gallen, two from Fribourg, and one each from Solothurn, Grisons and Valais.

List of Commanders
List:

|-style="text-align:center;"
|colspan=8|Guard disbanded(1527–1548)
|-

|-style="text-align:center;"
|colspan=8|Guard disbanded(1564–1566)
|-

|-style="text-align:center;"
|colspan=8|Post vacant(1798–1800)
|-

Notes

References

Commanders of the Swiss Guard